The 2022 Argentine Torneo Federal A, was the tenth season of the Torneo Federal A, the regionalised third tier of the Argentine football league system. The tournament is reserved for teams indirectly affiliated to the Asociación del Fútbol Argentino (AFA), while teams affiliated to AFA have to play the Primera B Metropolitana, which is the other third tier competition. The competition was contested by 29 of the 31 teams that took part in the 2021 season and four teams promoted from Torneo Regional Federal Amateur. Two teams will be promoted to Primera Nacional and four teams were relegated to Torneo Regional Federal Amateur. The season began on 27 march and ended in 13 November 2022.

Format

First stage
The 34 teams were split into two zones of 17 teams, where they will play against the other teams in their group twice: once at home and once away. The top eight teams from each zone qualified for the final stages.

Final Stages
The final stages was played between the 16 teams that qualified from the first stage. They were seeded in the final stages according to their results in the first stage, with the best eight seeded 1–8, and the worst eight teams seeded 9–16. The teams played four rounds and the winner was declared champion and automatically promoted to the Primera Nacional.

Relegation
After the first stage, the two bottom teams of each zone were relegated to the Torneo Regional Federal Amateur, giving a total of four teams relegated.

Club information

Zone A

Zone B

First stage

Zone A

Results

Zone B

Results

Final Stages
Teams ending in positions 1 to 8 will play the final stages for the second and last promotion berth to Primera Nacional, in which teams will be seeded in each round according to their final placement in the first stage of the tournament.
In all rounds, the teams were seeded according to their performance and placements in the previous stage of the competition and paired against a rival according to their seed: Team 1 vs. Team 16, Team 2 vs. Team 15 and so on, playing a single match on local ground, except the final that will be played in neutral ground. In all rounds, in case of tie, penalties will decide the winner.

First knockout round

Second knockout round

Third knockout round

Fourth knockout round

See also
 2022 Copa de la Liga Profesional
 2022 Argentine Primera División
 2022 Primera Nacional
 2022 Primera B Metropolitana
 2021–22 Copa Argentina

References

External links
 Sitio Oficial de AFA   
 Ascenso del Interior  
 Interior Futbolero 
 Solo Ascenso  
 Mundo Ascenso  
 Promiedos  

Torneo Federal A seasons
3